Knut Markhus (7 November 1878 – 7 August 1963) was a Norwegian educator and politician.

He was born in Skånevik. He edited the newspaper Haugesunds Avis from 1911 to 1913. In 1913 he founded the folk high school , where he eventually served as headmaster. He was elected to the Storting from Hordaland for the periods 1922–1930 and 1937–1945, representing the Liberal Party. He chaired Noregs Mållag from 1936 to 1946.

References

1878 births
1961 deaths
People from Sunnhordland
Heads of schools in Norway
Liberal Party (Norway) politicians
Nynorsk-language writers
Noregs Mållag leaders
Norwegian educators
Members of the Storting